Florin Cosmin Sabou (born 16 January 1980) is a Romanian former footballer who played as a midfielder.

References

External links
 
 

1980 births
Living people
People from Zalău
Romanian footballers
Liga I players
Liga II players
FC Bihor Oradea players
CF Liberty Oradea players
CS Gaz Metan Mediaș players
CSM Unirea Alba Iulia players
FC Zalău players
ACS Sticla Arieșul Turda players
Association football midfielders